The Cartmel Masterplan is a fan name for the planned Doctor Who backstory developed primarily by script editor Andrew Cartmel and writers Ben Aaronovitch and Marc Platt, by which they intended to restore some of the mystery of the Doctor's background that had been lost through revelation of the existing backstory. Although hints were dropped in the last two seasons, the proposed revelations never materialised on screen as the programme was not renewed for another season in 1990.

Some of the stories during the Seventh Doctor's tenure were intended to deal with the lack of mystery by suggesting that much of what was believed about the Doctor was wrong and that he was a far more powerful and mysterious figure than previously thought. In an untelevised scene in Remembrance of the Daleks (1988), the Doctor stated that he was "far more than just another Time Lord."

The suspension of the series in 1989 meant that none of these hints were ever resolved, and the subsequent production teams after the TV series resumed airing in 2005 did not directly pick up on these hints either. Despite this, 2010s executive producer Steven Moffat acknowledged in Doctor Who Magazine that the 1989 season "isn't so different" from the "new show" Russell T Davies and he made after 2005, and felt it was "extraordinary" how close Rona Munro's Survival (1989) was if you put it next to Davies' "Rose" (2005), while in a 2014 interview with Cartmel in Doctor Who Magazine, Aaronovitch acknowledged that the style of "today"'s Doctor Who is "like Rona's stuff", and Cartmel felt that the similarities between Remembrance and "The Day of the Doctor" (2013) made Remembrance "perhaps the closest thing in the twentieth-century series to a dry run" for "The Day of the Doctor".

The "Masterplan" was used as a guide for the Virgin New Adventures series of novels featuring the Seventh Doctor, and the revelations about the Doctor's origins were written into the penultimate New Adventures novel, Lungbarrow (1997) by Marc Platt. These origins were ignored and even contradicted in subsequent on screen stories.

The Other

Cartmel felt that years of explanations about the Doctor's origins and the Time Lords had removed much of the mystery and strength of the character of the Doctor, and decided to make the Doctor "once again more than a mere chump of a Time Lord". To do this, he built on the established mythology of the Time Lords:
More of these hints would have been seen in the story Lungbarrow, which was at one point planned for the programme's 1988–89 series. Lungbarrow would have been set in the Doctor's ancestral home on Gallifrey, but the story was abandoned; elements were adapted into the broadcast story Ghost Light (1989), but none of the Time Lord backstory survived the transformation. However, author Marc Platt eventually adapted his ideas for Lungbarrow (along with other elements of the "Masterplan") into a Doctor Who novel for the Virgin New Adventures series.

In 2014, Cartmel speculated that the "great secret" Lady Peinforte knew about the Doctor in Silver Nemesis was "perhaps" connected to his name, which during the siege on the Fields of Trenzalore in "The Time of the Doctor" (2013) is said to be what would allow the Time Lords to return to the universe.

The Other was first mentioned explicitly in the novelisation of Remembrance of the Daleks (1990) by Ben Aaronovitch as a shadowy figure in Time Lord history, one of the founding Triumvirate of Time Lord society after the overthrow of the cult of the Pythia that had, until then, dominated Gallifrey. The other two members of the Triumvirate were Rassilon and Omega.

Of the three, the Other's origins are the most obscure, with the circumstances of his birth and appearance being a mystery. Like Rassilon, various contradictory legends surround the Other, some hinting that he had powers surpassing that of Rassilon or Omega, and some even suggesting that he was not born on the Time Lords' home world of Gallifrey. Even his name is lost to time, which is why he is simply referred to as "the Other". A minor Gallifreyan festival known as Otherstide is celebrated yearly in his honour.

Susan Foreman
Retconning the Doctor's backstory was complicated by the existence of Susan Foreman, who was presented in the television series' earliest days as the Doctor's granddaughter. In different versions of the "Masterplan", different explanations were presented to deal with this: according to writer Lance Parkin, in the "original" version of the Masterplan, the Doctor rescued Susan as an infant from Gallifrey's recent past.

According to the novel of Lungbarrow, Susan Foreman was the granddaughter of "the Other", who may have been reincarnated as the Doctor. The Doctor, in his first incarnation, travelled back to the dawn of Time Lord civilisation and rescued a teenaged Susan, who recognised him as her grandfather. The Doctor did not initially recognise her, but knew that this was somehow true. This version of Susan's origins is reflected in many Doctor Who spin-offs, but not in the TV series under head writer and executive producer Steven Moffat. In "The Rings of Akhaten" (2013), the Eleventh Doctor mentions that he travelled to the rings of the planet Akhaten "a long time ago with my granddaughter", while in "Death in Heaven" (2014), written by Moffat, the Twelfth Doctor's companion Clara Oswald refers to the Doctor's missing "children and grandchildren". Moffat, answering a question in Doctor Who Magazine regarding the Doctor's marriages, referred to "some highly inventive material in the Virgin New Adventures books" that contradicts the Doctor Who TV series, but thinks this is a "separate (and equally valid) continuity" to the TV series. He also acknowledges that the Doctor "didn't just have children, he had grandchildren", and that "Actually, he had the beginnings of a dynasty."

References

Doctor Who concepts
Unfinished creative works